Matt Sinton (born 11 June 1976) is a New Zealand cyclist. He competed at the 2000 Summer Olympics in Sydney, in the Men's keirin and the men's track time trial.

He attended High School at Waitākere College.

References

1976 births
Living people
New Zealand male cyclists
Olympic cyclists of New Zealand
Cyclists at the 2000 Summer Olympics
20th-century New Zealand people